Contentment is an emotional and mental state.

Contentment may also refer to:
Contentment (Mount Crawford, Virginia), a historic home in Virginia, US
Contentment (Ansted, West Virginia), a historic home in West Virginia, US
 Contentment, U.S. Virgin Islands, a settlement

See also 
 Containment (disambiguation)